The United States women's cricket team is the team that represents the country of the United States in international women's cricket matches.

They have never been to the Women's Cricket World Cup; at the 2011 Women's Cricket World Cup Qualifier, the team finished fourth in its group with only one win.

In April 2018, the International Cricket Council (ICC) granted full Women's Twenty20 International (WT20I) status to all its members. Therefore, all Twenty20 matches played between the United States women and another international side after July 1, 2018 will be a full WT20I.

In March 2019, Julia Price was appointed as the head coach of the team. Price had previously played international cricket for Australia. Price stepped down from the role in May 2022, and was succeeded by Shivnarine Chanderpaul in July 2022 as women's senior and U-19 coach.

In December 2020, the ICC announced the qualification pathway for the 2023 ICC Women's T20 World Cup. The United States were named in the 2021 ICC Women's T20 World Cup Americas Qualifier regional group, alongside three other teams.

In May 2022, the ICC announced the United States as one of five women's sides to gain Women's One Day International (ODI) status.  Netherlands, Papua New Guinea, Scotland and Thailand are the other four teams.

Tournament history

Women's Cricket World Cup Qualifier 

 2011: 8th (DNQ)
 2021: DNQ

Women's T20 World Cup Qualifier
 2019: 7th (DNQ)
 2022: 8th (DNQ)

ICC Women's T20 World Cup Americas Qualifier
 2019: Winner (Q)
 2021: Winner (Q)

Records and statistics 

International Match Summary — United States Women
 
Last updated 25 September 2022

Twenty20 International 

 Highest team total: 117/3 v. the United Arab Emirates on 25 September 2022 at Tolerance Oval, Abu Dhabi.
 Highest individual score: 74*, Sindhu Sriharsha v. Bangladesh on 21 September 2022 at Sheikh Zayed Cricket Stadium, Abu Dhabi.
 Best individual bowling figures: 4/6, Suhani Thadani v. Argentina on 21 October 2021 at Reforma Athletic Club, Naucalpan.

Most T20I runs for USA Women

Most T20I wickets for USA Women

T20I record versus other nations

Records complete to WT20I #1235. Last updated 25 September 2022.

See also
 List of United States women Twenty20 International cricketers

References

Women's cricket teams in the United States
Cricket
United States in international cricket